Boots Plata (August 17, 1943 – November 2, 2011) was a Filipino movie director and writer.

Early life and career
Born Marcelino Victoriano in Quezon City. Plata, who directed the 1999 blockbuster film Isusumbong Kita Sa Tatay Ko featuring Fernando Poe Jr. and Judy Ann Santos, had requested to be cremated. He had also asked for his ashes to be scattered in the Pasig River, according to long-time friend, showbiz columnist Ethel Ramos.

"Many are wondering why he chose the Pasig River; he must have had good memories of the place. Before he died, he also told his wife Dolor not to hold a wake for him. "What he wants is to hold a party," Ramos told The Philippine Daily Inquirer by phone.

Plata  created over 10 films, mostly during the 1990s. His directorial debut was "Naked Island (Butil-Ulan) in 1984. He has also written two screenplays–"Bakit ‘Di Totohanin" (2001) and "Muling Ibalik ang Tamis ng Pag-ibig" (1998). He was assistant director to Joey Gosiengfiao in the sexy film "Nympha" (1980) and acting coach to the cast of "Mano Po 2: My Home" (2003).

Personal life
He was married to talent manager Dolor Guevarra with whom he had two daughters, Jaypee and Anes Guevarra.

Filmography

Director

Dubbing Director

Dubbing Supervisor

Assistant Director

Associate Director

Actor

Writer

Acting Coach

Production Manager

Production Designer

Health
Plata had his left leg amputated on December 16 last year as a complication to diabetes. An online report said a tumor was removed from one of Plata’s kidneys in 2007. However, biopsy conducted at the Capitol Medical Center said it was benign.

Cancer had already spread to his lungs and brain when it was diagnosed early this year, Ramos said. Plata refused to undergo chemotherapy two months ago, she added.

Death
Plata  succumbed to cancer at the St. Luke’s Medical Center in Quezon City. He was 68 and a diabetic who was diagnosed with lung cancer earlier in 2011.

References

1943 births
2011 deaths
Filipino writers
Filipino film directors
Filipino male film actors
People from Quezon City
Writers from Metro Manila
People with diabetes
Deaths from lung cancer in the Philippines
Burials at The Heritage Park